The Macintosh IIx is a personal computer designed, manufactured, and sold by Apple Computer from September 1988 to October 1990. This model was introduced as an update to the original Macintosh II, replacing the 16 MHz Motorola 68020 CPU and 68881 FPU with a 68030 CPU and 68882 FPU running at the same clock speed.

The 800 KB floppy drive was replaced with a 1.44 MB SuperDrive; the IIx is the first Macintosh to include this as standard.

The Mac IIx included 0.25 KiB of L1 instruction CPU cache, 0.25 KiB of L1 data cache, a 16 MHz bus (1:1 with CPU speed), and supported up to System 7.5.5.

The IIx was the second of three Macintosh models to use this case allowing dual floppy drives and 6 NuBus slots; the last model was the Macintosh IIfx. Apple's nomenclature of the time used the "x" to indicate the presence of the 68030 CPU as used in the Macintosh IIcx and IIvx.

Support and spare parts for the IIx were discontinued on August 31, 1998.

Timeline

References

External links
 Macintosh IIx technical specification at apple.com
 Macintosh IIx technical specifications at EveryMac (Accessed 9/11/2015)

x
IIx
IIx
IIx
Computer-related introductions in 1988